Mark Cossey is a former association football player who represented New Zealand at international level.

Cossey played two official A-international matches for the New Zealand in 1988, both against Pacific minnows Fiji, the first a 0–2 loss on 17 November, the second two days later a 0–1 loss on 19 November 1988.

References

External links
 

Year of birth missing (living people)
Living people
New Zealand association footballers
New Zealand international footballers
Association football midfielders